The two-lined ground skink (Kaestlea bilineata) is a species of skink. It is found in the Nilgiri Hills and Travancore Hills of India.

References

 Boulenger, George A. 1890 The Fauna of British India, Including Ceylon and Burma. Reptilia and Batrachia. Taylor & Francis, London, xviii, 541 pp.
 Eremchenko, V. K & I. Das 2004 Kaestlea: a new genus of scincid lizards (ScincidaLygosominae) from the Western Ghats, south-western India. Hamadryad 28 (1&2): 43-50
 Gray, J. E. 1846 Descriptions of some new species of Indian Lizards. Ann. Mag. Nat. Hist. (1)18: 429-430
 Ouboter, P.E. 1986 A revision of the genus Scincella (Reptilia: Sauria: Scincidae) of Asia, with some notes on its evolution. Zoologische Verhandelingen (Leiden) (No. 229) 1986: 1-66 PDF

Kaestlea
Reptiles described in 1846
Taxa named by John Edward Gray